Annette Marie Sarah Kellermann (6 July 1886 – 6 November 1975) was an Australian professional swimmer, vaudeville star, film actress, and writer.

Kellermann was one of the first women to wear a one-piece bathing costume, instead of the then-accepted pantaloons, and inspired others to follow her example. Kellerman's swimming costumes became so popular that she started her own fashion line of one-piece bathing suits. Kellermann helped popularize the sport of synchronised swimming, and authored a swimming manual. She appeared in several movies, usually with aquatic themes, and as the star of the 1916 film A Daughter of the Gods was the first major actress to appear nude in a Hollywood production. Kellermann was an advocate of health, fitness, and natural beauty throughout her life.

Early life 
Annette Kellermann (frequently recorded as "Kellerman") was born in Marrickville, New South Wales, Australia, on 6 July 1886, to Australian-born violinist Frederick William Kellermann, and his French wife, Alice Ellen Charbonnet, a pianist and music teacher.

At the age of six, a weakness in Kellermann's legs necessitated the wearing of steel braces to strengthen them. To further overcome her disability, her parents enrolled her in swimming classes at Cavill's Baths, a tidal swimming pool in the North Sydney suburb of Lavender Bay. By the age of 13, her legs were practically normal, and by 15, she had mastered all the swimming strokes and won her first race. At this time she was also giving diving displays.

Swimming career 

In 1902, Kellermann won the ladies' 100 yards and mile championships of New South Wales in the record times of 1 minute, 22 seconds and 33 minutes, 49 seconds respectively. In that same year, her parents decided to move to Melbourne, Victoria, and she was enrolled at Mentone Girls' Grammar School, where her mother had accepted a music teaching position.

During her time at school, Kellermann gave exhibitions of swimming and diving at the main Melbourne baths, performed a mermaid act at Princes Court entertainment centre, and did two shows a day swimming with fish in a glass tank at the Exhibition Aquarium. In June and July 1903, she performed sensational high dives in the Coogee scene of Bland Holt's spectacular, The Breaking of the Drought, at the Melbourne Theatre Royal.

Kellermann and Beatrice Kerr, who was billed as "Australia's Champion Lady Swimmer and Diver", were rivals, although Kerr's public challenges to Kellermann to meet in a competitive race went unanswered.

On 24 August 1905, aged 19, Kellermann was one of the first women to attempt to swim the English Channel. After three unsuccessful swims she declared, "I had the endurance but not the brute strength." The first woman to attempt a Channel crossing had been Austrian Baroness Walburga von Isacescu, in September 1900. She had made a previous effort the month before alongside Ted Heaton, but had to leave the water several miles out in the channel due to sea-sickness. Kellermann later challenged and defeated von Isacescu in a Danube race.

While in London a short was filmed of her performances and shown back in Australian venues. Kellermann helped popularize the sport of synchronised swimming after her 1907 performance of the first water ballet in a glass tank at the New York Hippodrome.

In 1911, she appeared on Broadway in the title role of “Undine”, an aquacade specialty conceived by composer Manuel Klein and performed in repertory with the popular musical Vera Violetta that featured Al Jolson.

Swimwear line
Kellermann advocated for the right of women to wear a one-piece bathing suit, which was controversial at the time. According to an Australian magazine, "In the early 1900s, women were expected to wear cumbersome dress and pantaloon combinations when swimming." Although Kellermann later claimed to have been arrested at Revere Beach for public indecency while wearing one of her suits, there are no contemporary police records or news stories corroborating this, and she appears to have invented the incident.

The popularity of her one-piece suits resulted in her own line of women's swimwear. The "Annette Kellermans", as they were known, were the first step towards modern women's swimwear.

Film career 

In 1916, Kellermann became the first major actress to perform in a nude scene when she appeared fully nude in A Daughter of the Gods. Made by Fox Film Corporation, A Daughter of the Gods was the first million-dollar film production. Like many of Kellermann's other films, this is now considered a lost film, as no copies are known to exist.

The majority of Kellermann's films had themes of aquatic adventure. She performed her own stunts including diving from  into the sea and  into a pool of crocodiles. Many times she would play mermaids named Annette or variations of her own name. Her "fairy tale films", as she called them, started with The Mermaid (1911), in which she was the first actress to wear a swimmable mermaid costume on film, paving the way for future screen sirens such as Glynis Johns (Miranda), Esther Williams, Ann Blyth (Mr. Peabody and the Mermaid) and Daryl Hannah (Splash). Kellermann designed her own mermaid swimming costumes and sometimes made them herself. Similar designs are still used by the Weeki Wachee Springs Mermaids, including her aquatic fairy costume first introduced in Queen of the Sea (1918, another lost film).

Kellermann appeared in one of the last films made in Prizma Color, Venus of the South Seas (1924), a US/New Zealand co-production where one reel of the 55-minute film was in colour and underwater. Venus of the South Seas was restored by the Library of Congress in 2004 and is the only feature film starring Kellermann known to exist in its complete form.

Publications 
In addition to her film and stage career, Kellermann wrote several books including How to Swim (1918), Physical Beauty: How to Keep It (1919), a book of children's stories titled Fairy Tales of the South Seas (1926), and My Story, an unpublished autobiography. She also wrote numerous mail order booklets on health, beauty, and fitness called The Body Beautiful.

Personal life 

Kellermann married her American-born manager, James Sullivan, on or around 26 November 1912 at Danbury, Connecticut.

A life-long vegetarian, Kellermann owned a health food store in Long Beach, California, later in life. She remained active well into old age, continuing to swim and exercise until a short time before her death. She and her husband returned to live in Australia in 1970, and in 1974, she was honoured by the International Swimming Hall of Fame at Fort Lauderdale, Florida.

Kellermann outlived her husband and died in the hospital at Southport, Queensland, Australia, on 6 November 1975, aged 88. She was cremated with Roman Catholic rites. Her remains were scattered in the Great Barrier Reef. She had no children.

Legacy 

In 1908, after a study of 3,000 women, Dudley A. Sargent of Harvard University dubbed Kellerman the "Perfect Woman" because of the similarity of her physical attributes to the Venus de Milo. During her Fox film series, she was often billed as ‘Australia’s Perfect Woman.’

Kellermann's large collection of costumes and theatrical memorabilia was bequeathed to the Sydney Opera House. Today, many of her original costumes and personal items are held by the Powerhouse Museum in Sydney, Australia.

The Mitchell Library, State Library of New South Wales has Kellerman’s archive of personal papers.

Kellerman was portrayed by Esther Williams in the film Million Dollar Mermaid (1952), and her name is on a star on the Hollywood Walk of Fame, on Hollywood Boulevard. An award-winning Australian documentary called The Original Mermaid, which was about Kellermann, was produced in 2002.

A swimming complex in Marrickville which opened December 2010 was named after her.

The streets in the suburb of Holt in the Australian capital Canberra are all named after Australian sportspeople, and Kellermann Close was named for her.

In 2016, X Swimwear, a made-to-measure swimwear line, launched a custom swimsuit called "The Kellerman" after her.

The American thoroughbred mare Annette K. (foaled in 1921 out of the mare Bathing Girl) was named after her.  Annette K. became the grandam of U.S. Triple Crown winner War Admiral.

Filmography 

 The Bride of Lammermoor: A Tragedy of Bonnie Scotland (1909, Short)
 Jephtah's Daughter: A Biblical Tragedy (1909, Short) - Jepthah's Daughter
 The Gift of Youth (1909, Short)
 Entombed Alive (1909, Short)
 The Mermaid (1911, Short) - Mermaid
 Siren of the Sea (1911, Short) - Siren of the Sea
 Neptune's Daughter (1914) - Annette, Neptune's daughter
 A Daughter of the Gods (1916) - Anitia - Daughter of the Gods
 National Red Cross Pageant (1917) - The Mediterranean - Italian episode
 Queen of the Sea (1918) - Merrilla, Queen of the Sea
 What Women Love (1920) - Annabel Cotton
 Venus of the South Seas (1924) - Shona Royale (final film role)

As herself 
 Miss Kellerman's Diving Feats (1907, Documentary short)
 Miss Annette Kellerman (1909, Documentary short)
 The Perfectly Formed Woman (1910, Short)
 The Universal Boy (1914)
 The Art of Diving (1920, Documentary short)
 Annette Kellermann Performing Water Ballet (1925, Documentary short)
 Annette Kellermann Returns to Australia (1933, Documentary short)
 Water Ballet: Sydney (1940, Short)
 Water Ballet (1941, Short)

Archival footage 
 The Love Goddesses (1965)
 The Original Mermaid (2002)

Works
 How to Swim
 Physical Beauty, How to Keep It

See also
 List of members of the International Swimming Hall of Fame

References

External links 
 

 "Annette Kellermann" at Women Film Pioneers Project
 Article and photo used in indecency trial Esquire v. Walker (Postmaster General)
 Annette Kellermann Online Exhibition at National Film and Sound Archive

1887 births
1975 deaths
19th-century Australian women
20th-century Australian actresses
Australian female swimmers
Australian Roman Catholics
Australian people of French descent
Australian silent film actresses
Australian synchronised swimmers
People associated with physical culture
People from Marrickville
People from Queensland
Vaudeville performers
Women film pioneers
Sport Australia Hall of Fame inductees
People educated at Mentone Girls' Grammar School